Professor Francis Philip McGlone (born November 1948) is a neuroscientist at Liverpool John Moores University, where he is the head of the Somatosensory & Affective Neuroscience Group.

Awards and honours 
In 2019, Professor McGlone & colleagues were awarded the Ig Nobel Peace Prize for their work on measuring The Pleasurability of Scratching an Itch

Selected publications
 Affective Touch and the Neurophysiology of CT Afferents (Joint editor)
 Itch: Basic Mechanisms and Therapy (Joint editor)

References

1948 births
British neuroscientists
Academics of Liverpool John Moores University
Alumni of the University of Sussex
Living people